Following are the results of the 2008 Qatar Open - Doubles tennis competition.  

Mikhail Youzhny and Nenad Zimonjić were the defending champions, but Youzhny chose not to participate and only Zimonjic competed that year.
Zimonjic partnered with Daniel Nestor, but lost in the quarterfinals to Simon Aspelin and Thomas Johansson.

Philipp Kohlschreiber and David Škoch won in the final 6–4, 4–6, [11–9], against Jeff Coetzee and Wesley Moodie.

Seeds

Draw

Draw

External links
 Main Doubles Draw

Doubles